Waghai is a town in the Dang District of the southern part of Gujarat state in India. And  also Taluka of dang district. Waghai is about 32 km west of the district headquarters of Ahwa, and about 52 km north-west of the hill station of Saputara. Vansda, Chikhli and Bilimora are located westerly. It is linked by state highway to the town of Chikhli (where the road meets National highway 8), and by a narrow gauge to the town of Bilimora. Also with Saputara a NG passenger train named. Waghai Passenger link these towns of south Gujarat.

Demographics
The population is about 1,75,000, of which 92% are local tribal people called "Dangi". Others are mixed people of India like Gujarati, Punjabi, Marathi, South Indian etc.

Economy
Waghai is the business place for the whole district; it is the main Gateway to enter Dang District.

Attractions

Gira Falls
Gira Falls A km. off the Saputara-Waghai Road leads to a vast clearing where the picturesque Gira Falls emerging from the Khapri tributary can be viewed. An absolute must from June to November. Visitors can get refreshments from a small tea and snack stall. Picnic Huts make it an ideal spot for relaxing and picnicking.There is also a botanical garden which is also a good attraction for tourist.

Botanical Garden
It is a large (24-hectare) garden with 1,400 varieties of plants from all over India. The amateur nature lover can marvel at different varieties of bamboo like the Chinese Bamboo, Golden Bamboo, Beer Bottle Bamboo, etc. and enjoy strolling along the beautiful walkways each lined with different species of tree. Visitors can also pick up cactus plants and enjoy a picnic at the picnic spot in the garden. Permission is required to enter. Drinking water and toilet facilities are available.

Unai Mata temple and Hot Springs
A drive of about 19 km. from Waghai brings one to the Unai Mata temple. Visitors can bathe in the hot spring attached to this famous temple of considerable historical significance.

Vansda National Park
A rich and old forest predominantly covered by very tall teak trees, mango groves and gigantic creepers. The forest is extremely dense and some parts are dark even during normal daytime. The forest is a habitat of monkeys, deer, a few leopards and a wide species of birds. Permission is required to enter the Park.

Shopping
A small private outlet selling locally crafted items fashioned out of Bamboo roots and chips. Unique items like the big sized bamboo lamps, kangaroos, deer are available only here and not elsewhere in the region.

government sawmill waghai
A sprawling sawmill and woodworking unit, which also sells furniture that tourists can book and get delivered by paying an advance. The visitor can enjoy a guided tour and watch the transformation of logs of wood into tasteful furniture. Drinking water facilities are available.

Education

Schools
 Govt. Secondary and higher secondary school.
 Aadarsh Nivashi School.
 Taluka School.
 Eklavya English medium School.
 Sardar School.
 Gyanmandir School.

Colleges
 Government Pollytechnic Engineering College
 Waghai College of Agriculture, NAU
 Hill Millet Research Station, NAU, Waghai
 Government PTC College
 Agriculture Cooperation, Banking & Marketing Polytechnic

Gallery

References

Cities and towns in Dang district, India